Redeem Tlang (born 22 February 1995) is an Indian professional footballer who plays as a winger for Goa in the Indian Super League.

Career

Shillong Lajong
A product of the Shillong Lajong youth academy, forward Tlang had risen to prominence during 2013 Shillong First Division League, the second tier in Shillong’s football league structure, where he had scored goals for fun for his club, compelling coach Singto to bring him into the senior side. He made his professional debut for Shillong Lajong in the I-League on 28 October 2013 against Churchill Brothers at the Nehru Stadium; in which he came on as a substitute for Seikhohau Tuboi in the 78th minute; as Shillong Lajong drew the match 2-2. He scored his first senior team goal for Lajong in the 4-0 thrashing of Salgaocar in the 2014 Federation Cup.

Tlang would spend a total of 9 years at the club including youth years.

NorthEast United
Tlang was loaned to NorthEast United from Shillong Lajong for the Inaugural Indian Super League season. He would only make one appearance, coming on as a substitute in a 3-0 win against Chennaiyin.

Tlang would then join NorthEast on a permanent basis starting 2018–19 Indian Super League. He scored his first goal in the Indian Super league against Bengaluru in a 2-1 win.  He was a regular during the season, making 19 appearances on the wing.

He scored his first goal of the 2019–20 against newly formed Odisha in a 2-1 win for his team. His second goal of the season came against Goa from the edge of the box in what proved to be a 2-2 stalemate on the 1st of November 2019.

Career statistics

Club

Honours
Goa
Durand Cup: 2021

References

1995 births
Living people
Indian footballers
Shillong Lajong FC players
NorthEast United FC players
People from Shillong
Footballers from Meghalaya
I-League players
Indian Super League players
Association football forwards
FC Goa players